Guy Maingon (born 31 July 1948) is a French former professional racing cyclist. He rode in the 1976 Tour de France.

References

External links
 

1948 births
Living people
French male cyclists
Sportspeople from Calvados (department)
Cyclists from Normandy